So Hot Right Now may refer to:

 So Hot Right Now (album), 2005 album by The Similou, or the title song
 "So Hot Right Now" (Jade MacRae song), 2005 song by Australian Jade MacRae